un-24 is a gene in fungus such as Neurospora crassa, encode Ribonucleoside-diphosphate reductase large chain, involved in their heterokaryon incompatibility.

See also 
 Un-25

References 

Fungus genes